The Changsha Meixihu International Culture and Arts Centre (Chinese: 梅溪湖國際文化藝術中心) is a cultural complex located in the Meixihu subdistrict of Changsha, Hunan, China. It was completed in 2019. The complex was designed by British architectural firm Zaha Hadid Architects.

Design 
The complex contains three separate cultural institutions: a theatre, a contemporary art museum (MICA), and a multi-purpose venue. It has a total floor area of 115,000 square metres. The design of the complex is characteristic of Zaha Hadid Architect's neo-futurist style. The exterior of the buildings are dominated by sweeping white-tiled curves.

The theatre, known as the Grand Theatre, is the largest building in the complex. It provides all front-of-house functions in lobbies, bars, and hospitality suites, as well as ancillary functions including administration offices, rehearsal studios, backstage logistics, wardrobe, and dressing rooms. The theatre has a capacity of 1800 seats.

The MICA art museum contains an atrium for large-scale installations and events, and has dedicated spaces for community workshops, a lecture theatre, a café, and a museum shop. The multi-purpose venue has a capacity of 500 seats.

Two pedestrian bridges connect the complex to Festival Island, a linear islet located in Meixi Lake.

Transport 
The complex is connected to line 2 of the Changsha Metro.

References 

Zaha Hadid buildings